is a town in Kimotsuki District. It is located in the eastern part of the Ōsumi Peninsula in Kagoshima Prefecture, Japan.

The town was formed on July 1, 2005 from the merger of the towns of Kōyama and Uchinoura, both from Kimotsuki District. As of October 2019, the town has an estimated population of 15,169. The total area is 308.12 km2.

The Uchinoura Space Center is located in this town.

Geography

Climate
Kimotsuki has a humid subtropical climate (Köppen climate classification Cfa) with hot summers and mild winters. Precipitation is significant throughout the year, and is heavier in summer, especially the months of June and July.

Demographics
Per Japanese census data, the population of Kimotsuki in 2020 is 14,227 people. Kimotsuki has been conducting censuses since 1920. The town's population peaked in the 1950s and has been slowly declining since then, with no sign of a recovery until 2020.

Points of Interest
 Nikaido House (National Important Cultural Property)
 Tsukazaki Kofun Cluster (National Historic Site)
 Trace of Koyama Castle (National Historic Site)
 Shijukusho Shrine
 Uchinoura Space Center
 Todoro Falls
 Osumi Nanbu Prefectural Natural Park 
 Yabusame Public Park

Culture

Events and festivals
 Doya Doya Sa (January 7th)
 Staff and sickle dances (March)
 Nagoshidon (mid-August)
 Honmachi Hachigatsu Odori (Fourth Saturday of August, every even year)
 Eggane Festival (September or October)
 Yabusame Festival (Third Sunday of October)
 Uchinoura Galaxy Marathon, commemorating the formation of the Republic of Uchinoura and the Galaxy Federation (November)

Mascots
Kimotsuki has two town mascots (see yuru-chara) created by the Kimotsuki Tourism Association. Both wear purple outfits based on the traditional costume of the Yabusame Festival archer and have satellite heads. They generally make appearances at town sanctioned events.
 Itemaru-kun: An alien born in 2010 when asteroid-explorer Hayabusa returned to earth.
 Hayabusame-kun: A sea turtle, named by combining the words "hayabusa" and "yabusame."

Sister City Relations

The Galaxy Federation
Before the merger, the town of Uchinoura was a part of the Galaxy Federation, a chain of friendship cities that each house a JAXA space center. It joined the federation as a founding member on November 8, 1987 and received the name the Republic of Uchinoura. The friendship city relations were still retained when Uchinoura merged with Koyama to become Kimotsuki town, and it is now called the Republic of Uchinoura Kimotsuki within the federation. The most recent member of the federation, the city of Kakuda in Miyagi Prefecture, joined on April 2, 2016.
 Ofunato, Iwate (The Republic of Sanriku Ofunato)
 Noshiro, Akita (The Republic of Noshiro)
 Saku, Nagano (The Republic of Saku)
 Sagamihara, Kanagawa (The Republic of Sagamihara)
 Taiki, Hokkaido (The Republic of Taiki)
 Kakuda, Miyagi (The Republic of Kakuda)

Space Brother Cities
Kimotsuki and the town of Minamitane, home to Tanegashima's JAXA space center, signed the “Space Brother Cities Declaration” on July 3, 2013. The naming comes from the manga and anime series Space Brothers, and the official document even features an illustration of the two main characters, the Nanba brothers.

References

External links

Kimotsuki official website 
Kimotsuki Wikipedia page 

Towns in Kagoshima Prefecture